72 Ophiuchi is a binary star system in the equatorial constellation of Ophiuchus. It is visible to the naked eye as a faint, white-hued point of light with a combined apparent visual magnitude of 3.73. It is located approximately 86.9 light years away from the Sun based on parallax, but is moving closer with a heliocentric radial velocity of -23.9 km/s.

According to Gray et al. (2003), the primary component has a stellar classification of A5 V, matching an A-type main-sequence star. Cowley et al. (1969) had assigned it to a class of A4 IVs, suggesting it is a sharp-lined (s) subgiant star. The latter class is still in use by some sources.

The primary is 250 million years old with double the mass of the Sun and is spinning with a moderate projected rotational velocity of 65 km/s.

References

A-type main-sequence stars
Circumstellar disks
Binary stars

Ophiuchus (constellation)
BD+09 3564
Ophiuchi, 72
9615
165777
088771
6771